Ben Shewry (born 1977) is a New Zealand chef and owner of Attica restaurant in Melbourne.

Early life
Shewry is a Melbourne, Australia-based chef who grew up on the North Island of New Zealand in the North Taranaki town of Waitara. His food is influenced by his childhood upbringing in the natural surroundings of North Taranaki. He had his first job in a local restaurant when he was 10, he worked in a bakery when he was 13, and he had his first kitchen job when he was 14.

Career 
Shewry was one of six chefs featured in the inaugural season of the Netflix original documentary Chef's Table. In the documentary his life, struggles, and inspiration for cooking are detailed. His cooking philosophy is deeply rooted in using indigenous ingredients readily available, in both the Australian and New Zealand contexts. Shewry has expressed enthusiasm about his own inspiration by the indigenous Maori hangi (or earth oven feast ceremony), and other indigenous ingredients such as kūmara (sweet potato) and native mutton bird.

The use of ingredients native to Australia in a top restaurant was a new idea that was not widely accepted initially, making it difficult for his restaurant to garner a following. Eventually, his unorthodox style of cooking was recognized by locals and critics, and today Attica has received several prestigious awards and attracts top chefs from around the world.  Shewry also features in the Netflix series Restaurant Australia and Chef's Table.

In 2019, his restaurant Attica was named Australia's best restaurant at the Gourmet Traveller food awards.

References

External links
 Attica Restaurant
 The World's 50 Best Restaurants

1977 births
Living people
Australian chefs
New Zealand emigrants to Australia
People from Taranaki